Madurantakam (Tamil: மதுராந்தகம்), is a town in Tamil Nadu.

Madurantakam may also refer to:
 Madurantakam taluk, is a taluk.
 Madurantakam block, is a revenue block.
 Madurantakam division, is a revenue division.
 Madurantakam railway station, is a railway station.
 Maduranthakam (state assembly constituency), is a state assembly constituency.
 Madhurantakam Rajaram, was an Indian author.